The Volvo Titan was a heavy duty truck produced by Swedish automaker Volvo between 1951 and 1973.

Volvo Titan 
In the autumn of 1951 Volvo introduced its largest truck L395 Titan, with a payload capacity of up to 10 tonnes. The large VDF engine was replaced in 1953 with the further developed D96 engine. The following year, the Titan became the first Volvo truck to be offered with a turbodiesel. In 1956 the truck was equipped with air brakes.

1959 saw the introduction of the refined L495 Titan.  In 1964 Volvo introduced the forward control L4951 Titan Tiptop with a tilting cab.

Volvo N88 
In 1965 Volvo introduced its "System 8". As part of the changes Volvo presented a successor to the Titan, called N88. The new truck retained the Titan's cab, but underneath it the conventional N88 sported all the new features of the forward control F88. These included a new engine, a fully synchronized eight-speed gear box and improved chassis and suspension.

Engines

Gallery

References

External links 

 Volvo Trucks Global - history
 Swedish brass cars - picture gallery

Titan
Vehicles introduced in 1951